In cricket, a five-wicket haul (also known as a "five–for" or "fifer") refers to a bowler taking five or more wickets in a single innings. This is regarded as a notable achievement, and  only 49 bowlers have taken at least 15 five-wicket hauls at the international level in their cricketing careers. Nathan Lyon is a right-arm off-spinner who has represented Australia in Tests, One Day Internationals (ODI), and Twenty20 Internationals (T20I). , Lyon has taken 23 five-wicket hauls for his country across 111 Tests, 29 ODIs, and 2 T20Is.

Lyon made his Test debut against Sri Lanka at the Galle International Stadium on 31 August 2011, and became the 30th Australian cricketer to take a five-wicket haul on Test debut, taking 5 wickets for 34 runs in the first innings. In Test matches, Lyon has been most successful against India, taking 9 of his 23 five-wicket hauls against them. His best figures in an innings of 8/50 came against the same team, taken at the M. Chinnaswamy Stadium, Bengaluru, on 4 March 2017. , his 446 wickets in Tests are the third-most for an Australian cricketer and eighth-highest across all cricketing nations.

Lyon's ODI debut was against Sri Lanka at the Adelaide Oval on 8 March 2012. , he is yet to take a five-wicket haul in the format, with his best figures being 4/44, taken against Zimbabwe at the Harare Sports Club on 31 August 2014. Lyon made his T20I debut against India on 29 January 2016 at the Melbourne Cricket Ground. His only wicket in the format, was taken against Pakistan at the Dubai International Cricket Stadium on 28 October 2018.

, Lyon's tally of 23 five-wicket hauls is tied twenty-fifth in the all-time list across all formats and is sixth in the equivalent list for Australia. He has taken ten five-wicket hauls in Asia, the most by a visiting spinner there. 

A ten-wicket haul occurs when a bowler takes ten wickets in either across two innings in a two-innings match or, rarely, in a single innings. , Lyon has taken ten wickets in a match three times in Tests, one of 48 players to take 3 or more ten-wicket hauls and tied twenty-ninth highest in all cricketing nations.

Key

Test five-wicket hauls

Test ten-wicket hauls

Notes

References

Lists of Australian cricket records and statistics
Lyon, Nathan